Daniel "Danny" Ecker (born 21 July 1977 in Leverkusen) is a former German athlete competing in the pole vault.

Biography 
His current personal best is 5.93 metres, but through his indoor best performance of 6.00 metres he has a place in the so-called 6 metres club. 5.93 ranks him fourth among German pole vaulters, behind Tim Lobinger, Andrei Tivontchik and Michael Stolle.

He won a bronze medal at the 2007 IAAF World Championships and the 1999 IAAF World Indoor Championships and placed fourth at the 1999 World Championships. At the Olympic Games he finished eighth in 2000 and fifth in 2004. He won the 2007 European Athletics Indoor Championships.

Danny Ecker is the son of Heide Rosendahl, who became Olympic long jump champion in 1972, and US basketball player John Ecker. His team is Bayer 04 Leverkusen. Danny Ecker married in 2006. He has two daughters.

He stated that he would retire from competition at the end of the 2012 season after he missed the German Championships (and qualification for the European Championships and Olympic Games) due to an injury.

Competition record

See also
 Germany all-time top lists - Pole vault

References

External links 

 
 
 
 Leverkusen who's who

1977 births
Living people
Sportspeople from Leverkusen
German male pole vaulters
German national athletics champions
Athletes (track and field) at the 2000 Summer Olympics
Athletes (track and field) at the 2004 Summer Olympics
Athletes (track and field) at the 2008 Summer Olympics
World Athletics Championships medalists
Olympic athletes of Germany